The Gunning–Purves Building is located in Friendship, Wisconsin. It was added to the National Register of Historic Places in 2015.

History
Constructed in 1904, the building has housed several commercial businesses. Among its features is pressed metal provided by George L. Mesker & Co. on both the interior and exterior. The building was purchased by the historical society of Adams County, Wisconsin 2011 and became the 'Adams County Heritage Center'.

References

Commercial buildings on the National Register of Historic Places in Wisconsin
National Register of Historic Places in Adams County, Wisconsin
Commercial buildings completed in 1904